Scopula elisabethae is a moth of the  family Geometridae. It is found in Uganda, Cameroon, the Democratic Republic of Congo, Gabon and the Republic of Congo.

References

Moths described in 1934
Taxa named by Louis Beethoven Prout
elisabethae
Moths of Africa